Great Guns! is a 1927 Oswald the Lucky Rabbit cartoon produced by the Walt Disney Studio and Winkler Productions. It was re-issued by Walter Lantz Productions in 1932. It was originally released on October 17, 1927.

Plot

War is declared, and Oswald enlists in the army. He shows off his uniform and weapon to impress his girlfriend. Later he is shown in a trench in a battlefield kissing her photo. A mouse piloting an airplane drops a bomb, destroying the photo. Angered, Oswald boards a plane and engages in a dogfight with the mouse's plane. Both planes crash and they begin hand-to-hand fighting. A large enemy dog approaches, causing Oswald to attempt to flee. He encounters an elephant, and uses the elephant's trunk to fire cannonballs at the dog. The dog fires cannonballs back at Oswald from a cannon. Oswald catches most of the balls and throws them back. Unfortunately one hits Oswald, reducing him to coal. His girlfriend, now a Red Cross  nurse, appears and gathers the pieces in a basket and takes them to a hospital. She pours them into a cocktail shaker and after shaking them, pours them out and restores Oswald. They joyously embrace and kiss each other.

Home media
The short was released on December 11, 2007, on Walt Disney Treasures: The Adventures of Oswald the Lucky Rabbit.

Legacy

In the Disney video game Epic Mickey, where Disney shorts starring Mickey Mouse and Oswald the Lucky Rabbit are used for navigation, Great Guns! is one of the shorts that can be played through.

References

External links
 Great Guns! at Google Drive

1927 animated films
1927 films
1920s Disney animated short films
1920s war films
Oswald the Lucky Rabbit cartoons
Films directed by Walt Disney
American black-and-white films
American silent short films
Universal Pictures animated short films
Animated films about animals
Animated films without speech
1920s American films
Silent American comedy films